Paul Cook is an American science fiction writer and classical music critic. He is a Principal Lecturer in the English Department at Arizona State University.

Works

Novels
Paul Cook has written eight science fiction novels.
 Tintagel (1981). Ace Science Fiction. Finalist for the 1982 Locus Award for Best First Novel.
 The Alejandra Variations (1984). Ace Science Fiction.
 Duende Meadow (1985). Bantam Spectra.
 Halo (1986). Bantam Spectra.
 On The Rim Of The Mandala (1987). Bantam Spectra.
 Fortress On The Sun (1997). Roc SF; Reprint (2008). Phoenix Pick/Arc Manor Books
 The Engines Of Dawn (1999). Roc SF; Reprint (2008). Phoenix Pick/Arc Manor Books
 Karma Kommandos (2008). Phoenix Pick/Arc Manor Books

Other writing
Paul Cook has published short stories in Amazing Stories, Digital Science Fiction, Isaac Asimov's Science Fiction, The Hawai'i Review, The Magazine of Fantasy and Science Fiction, The Nameless Review, and New Letters. He also writes book reviews for Galaxy's Edge Magazine.

He has published poems in a wide variety of literary non mainstream magazines such as The Georgia Review and Quarterly West.

He has written classical music criticism for such venues as ClassicsToday.com and MusicWeb-International.com, and now writes classical music reviews exclusively for The American Record Guide. He has written extensively on the music of Hindemith, Prokofiev, Shostakovich, and Stravinsky.

He most recently wrote the introduction to the 2006 edition of Edgar Rice Burroughs' novel Tanar of Pellucidar (Bison Books/University of Nebraska Press) and is the Series Editor for the Phoenix Science Fiction Classic series from Phoenix Pick/Arc Manor books.

References

External links
 Paul Cook's official website at paulcook-sci-fi.com
 
 The American Record Guide at AmericanRecordGuide.com
 Arc Manor's official website at ArcManor.com
 Phoenix Pick (Science Fiction Imprint of Arc Manor) at PhoenixPick.com

Living people
20th-century American novelists
20th-century American short story writers
20th-century American male writers
21st-century American novelists
21st-century American short story writers
21st-century American male writers
American male novelists
American male short story writers
American science fiction writers
Arizona State University faculty
University of Utah alumni
Year of birth missing (living people)